Bloomfield Hospital is a non-for-profit healthcare provider in Rathfarnham providing a mental health service.  It was formerly known as The Retreat at Bloomfield.  The hospital was significantly redeveloped in the 2000s.

History
The hospital was founded in 1812 by the Religious Society of Friends (Quakers).  An AGM report from 1827 shows several members of the Pim family on the committee, with James Pim, later to be heavily associated with the Dublin and Kingstown Railway, as Treasurer.

Developers made arrangements with the Religious Society of Friends to redevelop the hospital and provide a meeting house for the Quakers whilst retaining some of the old buildings.

References

Sources

External links
 Official website
Teaching hospitals in Dublin (city)
1812 establishments in Ireland
Teaching hospitals of the University of Dublin, Trinity College